DePatie–Freleng Enterprises (also known as Mirisch-Geoffrey-DePatie-Freleng Productions when involved with the Mirisch brothers and Geoffrey Productions; and DFE Films) was an American animation production company that was active from 1963 to 1981. Based in Burbank, DFE produced animation for film and television.

Notable among these are the opening titles for The Pink Panther, its sequels and an associated series of theatrical shorts featuring the character of the same name, entries in the Looney Tunes and Merrie Melodies series from 1964 to 1967, the Dr. Seuss television specials from 1971 to 1982, the lightsaber effects in the original Star Wars, and the Time for Timer ABC public service announcements in the early 1970s.

History

Origins 
DFE was formed by two former employees at Warner Bros. Cartoons, director/composer/producer Friz Freleng and executive David H. DePatie, after Warner Bros. closed its animation studio in May of 1963. Although Freleng and DePatie were no longer working for Warner Bros., a generous gesture from a Warner executive allowed Freleng and DePatie to lease the former Warner cartoons studio on California Street in Burbank, complete with equipment and supplies for a few dollars each year. Although DFE's initial business was commercials and industrial films, several lucky breaks put the new studio into the theatrical cartoon business.

Director Blake Edwards contacted DFE and asked them to design a panther character for Edwards's new film, The Pink Panther. Pleased with the design by Hawley Pratt for the character, Edwards contracted with DFE to produce the animated titles for the film. Upon the film's release, the titles garnered a tremendous amount of attention, so much that a large amount of the picture's gross is believed to have been generated by the success of DFE's title sequence.

DFE then signed with United Artists to produce a series of animated short subjects featuring the Pink Panther, which included over 100 shorts for both theatrical and television audiences through 1980. Also in 1964, DePatie and Freleng's longtime employer, Warner Bros., agreed with DFE to produce additional new Looney Tunes and Merrie Melodies cartoon shorts for theatrical release.

DePatie and Freleng soon found themselves overflowing with work; as many of the animators who had worked at Warner Bros. during the 1950s and 1960s returned to the old Warner cartoon studio to work for DFE. The first entry in the Pink Panther series, The Pink Phink,  was directed by Freleng and won the studio its only Academy Award in 1964. In 1966, DFE would receive another Academy Award nomination for The Pink Blueprint, before losing the award.

The Pink Panther and other television series 
The Pink Panther theatrical series of cartoons became the basis of a Saturday morning television series, The Pink Panther Show on September 1969, which also included theatrical cartoons of The Inspector (introduced in 1966) and eventually The Ant and the Aardvark, Roland and Rattfink (introduced in 1968), and The Texas Toads (Tijuana Toads). Like most animated television cartoons at the time, The Pink Panther Show contained a laugh track with narration. The cartoons were edited and in some cases re-dubbed to meet television standards and practices for content.

The Pink Panther Show had several incarnations during the 1970s. The show was very popular on NBC's Saturday morning line-up, starting as a half-hour program and expanding a few years later to 90 minutes each week. The studio provided the animated sequences for the 1969–1970 television series My World and Welcome to It based on the drawings of James Thurber. DFE was one of the subcontractors for the 1964–1967 Warner Bros. cartoons, along with Format Productions.

The Looney Tunes/Merrie Melodies shorts made by the studio can be easily identified by their modernized "Abstract WB" opening and closing sequences (although the "Abstract WB" opening and closing sequences were first used in three cartoons made by Warner Bros. Cartoons). However, select 1964–1967 DePatie–Freleng Looney Tunes and Merrie Melodies (most notably those directed by Rudy Larriva) were panned by fans and critics alike. DFE did not continue doing Warner cartoon work until the late 1970s/early 1980s, with the TV specials Bugs Bunny's Easter Special (1977), Bugs Bunny's Looney Christmas Tales (1979), and Daffy Duck's Easter Egg-Citement (1980).

DFE also created Return to the Planet of the Apes, which ran on NBC from 1975 to 1976 and The Oddball Couple, which ran on Saturday mornings on ABC from 1975 to 1977. One of the studio's television specials was The Bear Who Slept Through Christmas (1973), with Tommy Smothers voicing the little bear who goes out to find Christmas (in the human world) while his fellow bears head for hibernation. DFE was also responsible for a number of Dr. Seuss specials, including The Cat In The Hat and different incarnations of The Grinch.

Later years 
In 1981, Freleng and DePatie sold DFE Films to Marvel Comics, and Freleng returned to Warner Bros. Animation, which Warner Bros. had re-opened the previous year, to produce a series of feature films featuring vintage Warner cartoons with new connecting footage. DePatie made the transition to become the head of Marvel Productions, as DFE was renamed. In March of 1982, David DePatie announced that they started producing animated programs. The DePatie–Freleng name was later revived in-name-only in 1984 for Pink Panther and Sons, which was otherwise entirely produced by Hanna-Barbera Productions.

Although Marvel produced mainly superhero cartoons and animated series based on licensed toy lines (including Hasbro properties), it continued to produce new productions starring the Pink Panther (a special for television Pink at First Sight and motion picture titles for Trail of the Pink Panther and Curse of the Pink Panther). Metro-Goldwyn-Mayer Animation would later make a 1993 revival show of the Pink Panther as a joint venture between MGM, Mirisch-Geoffrey-DePatie-Freleng and United Artists, a decade after DFE's merger with Marvel and Mirisch/UA's merger into MGM.

In 1993, Marvel Productions was renamed to New World Animation, and was completely absorbed in 1996 after News Corporation purchased New World Entertainment, ending the life of the studio that once was DFE. Marvel would eventually continue to produce animated shows through a partnership with Saban Entertainment, which had recently acquired a 50% stake in Fox Kids. In 2001, Fox Family Worldwide (which included Saban Entertainment) were sold to The Walt Disney Company.

Subsequent ownership 
In 2009, The Walt Disney Company purchased Marvel Entertainment, bringing DFE's libraries of all-original and Marvel Comics-based cartoons full circle under one roof; all of these properties are now distributed by Disney–ABC Domestic Television. The Dr. Seuss specials animated by DFE are currently distributed by Warner Bros. Home Entertainment through the Dr. Seuss estate.

While the television catalog has often changed hands over the years, the theatrical cartoons continue to be owned by their original distributors: United Artists (via its current corporate parent, MGM) for The Mirisch Company cartoon library and Warner Bros. for the Looney Tunes/Merrie Melodies cartoons.

List of theatrical and television cartoons 
In a short time, DFE began producing television shows as well as theatricals and specials, becoming a competitor to Hanna-Barbera and Filmation. The studio's various cartoons, specials and shows are listed below.

Theatrical series 
Original series

Commissioned series
 Looney Tunes and Merrie Melodies (for Warner Bros., 1964–1967)

TV series 

Commissioned series
 Sesame Street ("The Pink Panther karate-chops a K") (for Children's Television Workshop) (1970)
 Doctor Snuggles (for Polyscope Productions, with Topcraft) (1979)

TV specials 

Commissioned specials

TV commercials 
 Time for Timer
 The Bod Squad
 Charlie the Tuna
 Little Caesars

Film and television title design 
Pink Panther series
 The Pink Panther (1963)
 A Shot in the Dark (sub-contracted to George Dunning & Associates, 1964)
 Inspector Clouseau (sub-contracted to TVC London, 1968)
 The Return of the Pink Panther (sub-contracted to Richard Williams Studio, 1975)
 The Pink Panther Strikes Again (sub-contracted to Richard Williams Studio, 1976)
 Revenge of the Pink Panther (1978)

Other films:
 The Dead Ringer (1964)
 The Best Man (1964)
 Sex and the Single Girl (1964)
 How to Murder Your Wife (1965)
 Love Has Many Faces (1965)
 The Satan Bug (1965)
 the maps used in The Hallelujah Trail (1965)
 The Art of Love (1965)
 The Great Race (1965)
 Do Not Disturb (1965)
 The Trouble with Angels (1966)
 the animated films parodying the Bell Telephone films in The President's Analyst (1967)
 With Six You Get Eggroll (1968)
 Star Wars (1977) (special effects)
 Capricorn One (1978) (special effects)

Other TV series
 Rawhide (TV series, 1965) (season 8)
 The Wild Wild West (TV series, 1965-1969)
 The Wild Wild West Revisited (TV film, 1979)
 More Wild Wild West (TV film, 1979)
 I Dream of Jeannie (TV series, 1965–1970)
I Dream of Jeannie...15 years later (TV film, 1985)
I Still Dream of Jeannie (TV film 1991)
 My World and Welcome to It (TV series, 1969–1971)

Former Warner Bros. Cartoons employees at DePatie–Freleng 
In the beginning, DePatie–Freleng had virtually the same facilities, personnel and producer as Warner Bros. Cartoons. Although Chuck Jones would later work with DePate–Freleng on The Cat in the Hat, Jones and most of his group of artists ended up at Sib Tower 12 Productions independently producing new Tom and Jerry cartoons for MGM.

Although many DePatie–Freleng employees contributed greatly to the success of its product, story artist and Disney and Warner alumnus John W. Dunn created most of the studios' new cartoon series, both for theatrical release and for television. These series included The Ant & The Aardvark, The Tijuana Toads, Here Comes The Grump, and Roland and Ratfink, among others.

Many of the DFE cartoons were written and storyboarded by Dunn, including the first Pink Panther cartoon, The Pink Phink. Dunn's drawing style also found its way into the DFE cartoons.

The list below features many former Warner staffers, but also includes former Disney, MGM and Lantz staffers as well.

Producers 
 Friz Freleng
 David H. DePatie
 Ted Geisel (Dr. Seuss specials)
 Chuck Jones (The Cat in the Hat)

Directors 
 Friz Freleng
 Hawley Pratt
 Robert McKimson
 Art Leonardi
 Gerry Chiniquy
 Art Davis
 Sid Marcus
 George Singer
 George Gordon
 Grant Simmons
 Cullen Blaine (credited as Cullen Houghtaling)

Writers 
 John W. Dunn
 David Detiege
 Len Janson
 Don Jurwich
 Bob Kurtz
 Jim Ryan
 Nick Bennion
 Al Bertino
 Tom Dagenais
 Dale Hale
 Michael O'Connor
 Sid Marcus
 Irv Spector

Voices 
 Carl Esser
 Sarah Kennedy
 Karen Smith
 Kathy Gori
 Frank Welker
 Jim Begg
 Rip Taylor
 Paul Frees
 John Byner
 Mel Blanc
 Daws Butler
 Larry Storch
 Ralph James
 Arte Johnson
 Hal Smith
 Gege Pearson
 Joan Gerber
 Stan Freberg
 Pat Harrington Jr.
 Gonzales Gonzales
 June Foray
 Bob Holt
 Don Messick
 Allan Sherman
 Paul Winchell
 Hans Conried
 Thurl Ravenscroft
 Arnold Stang
 Rich Little
 Laura Olsher
 Marvin Miller
 Lennie Weinrib
 Dave Barry

Music 
 William Lava
 Herman Stein
 Doug Goodwin
 Irving Gertz
 Walter Greene
 Henry Mancini
 Dean Elliott
 Joe Raposo
 Steve DePatie

References

External links 
 Unofficial DePatie-Freleng website
 

 
American companies established in 1963
American companies disestablished in 1981
American animation studios
Mass media companies established in 1963
Mass media companies disestablished in 1981
1963 establishments in California
1981 disestablishments in California
Companies based in Burbank, California